Tomeyamagawa Dam is a gravity dam located in Yamagata Prefecture in Japan. The dam is used for flood control. The catchment area of the dam is 7.2 km2. The dam impounds about 9  ha of land when full and can store 1120 thousand cubic meters of water. The construction of the dam was started on 1990 and completed in 2011.

References

Dams in Yamagata Prefecture
2011 establishments in Japan